Markus Korkiakoski (born March 4, 1992) is a Finnish professional ice hockey forward who currently plays for HC Poruba in the Chance Liga, the second-tier league of the Czech Republic.

Career
Korkiakoski began his career with Kärpät's junior team, playing in their Jr. C, Jr. B and Jr. A teams between 2007 and 2013 but was unable to feature in their senior team. After three separate loan spells with Mestis Kiekko-Laser, Hokki and LeKi, Korkiakoski joined Hokki as a permanent member on May 24, 2014.

On April 28, 2017, he joined Hermes of Mestis. He left the team however in December and rejoined Hokki who were now playing in the third-tier Suomi-sarja. He registered two assists in his only game back with the team before finishing the season with French team Étoile Noire de Strasbourg in the Ligue Magnus.

On June 29, 2018, Korkiakoski signed for HC Stadion Litoměřice of the Chance Liga for the 2018–19 season, which also included a single game spell in the Czech Extraliga for HC Litvínov.

References

External links

1992 births
Living people
Étoile Noire de Strasbourg players
Finnish ice hockey forwards
HC Stadion Litoměřice players
Hokki players
Iisalmen Peli-Karhut players
Kiekko-Laser players
Kokkolan Hermes players
Lempäälän Kisa players
HC Litvínov players
Sportspeople from North Ostrobothnia
HC RT Torax Poruba players
Finnish expatriate ice hockey players in the Czech Republic
Finnish expatriate ice hockey players in France
Finnish expatriate ice hockey players in Poland
JKH GKS Jastrzębie players